Elena Ceampelea (born 3 March 1947) is a Romanian former artistic gymnast. She competed at the 1964 and 1972 Summer Olympics and both times finished in sixth place all-around with the Romanian team. Her best personal achievement was eighth place in the floor exercise in 1972.

References

1947 births
Living people
Olympic gymnasts of Romania
Romanian female artistic gymnasts
Gymnasts at the 1964 Summer Olympics
Gymnasts at the 1972 Summer Olympics